Matters of Life and Dating is a 2007 American romantic comedy television film directed by Peter Wellington and written by Nina Colman, based on the 1990 memoir Up Front: Sex and the Post-Mastectomy Woman by Linda Dackman. The film stars Ricki Lake as Dackman, who struggles to re-enter the dating world after being diagnosed with breast cancer and undergoing a mastectomy and breast reconstruction. Holly Robinson Peete and Rachael Harris also star.

The film aired on Lifetime on October 22, 2007.

Plot
Linda is a single woman who must re-enter the dating world after undergoing a mastectomy and breast reconstruction surgery due to cancer.

Cast
 Ricki Lake as Linda Dackman
 Holly Robinson Peete as Nicole Banning
 Rachael Harris as Carla
 Dylan Neal as Guy DeMayo
 Gabriel Hogan as Kevin
 Nigel Bennett as Errol Sager
 Noam Jenkins as Jacques

Production
The film is based on the memoirs of Linda Dackman. Lifetime approached songwriters Kara DioGuardi and James Poyser to write a song, "My Bra" performed by Mýa, for the film.

Release 
Matters of Life and Dating premiered on Lifetime Television on October 22, 2007, as part of the channel's "Stop Breast Cancer for Life" campaign.

Reception 
Kevin McDonough of the Intelligencer Journal criticized the film, writing that "It's hard to find fault with a movie trying to help women cope with a life-threatening illness, but Linda's plight might be more accessible if she weren't so darned successful and living such a fabulous two-double-latte-a-day existence and having to fend off so many handsome suitors." A reviewer for the Akron Beacon Journal was also critical, as they felt that Lake's performance was one of the film's major flaws.

References

External links
 

2007 television films
2007 films
2007 romantic comedy films
2000s American films
2000s English-language films
American comedy television films
American films based on actual events
American romantic comedy films
Comedy films based on actual events
Films about cancer
Films based on memoirs
Films directed by Peter Wellington
Films scored by Anton Sanko
Lifetime (TV network) films
Romance films based on actual events
Romance television films
Television films based on actual events
Television films based on books